was a Japanese sculptor, a pioneer of Japanese modern and contemporary arts. In 1994, he was officially recognized by the Japanese government as a "Person of Cultural Merit;" and in 2001, the Order of Culture was conferred.

Early life
Toshio was born in 1911 in Asago in Hyōgo Prefecture.  He was a 1933 graduate of the Tokyo School of Fine Arts.

Honors
Emperor Akihito personally conferred the Order of Culture on sculptor Toshio Yodoi as Prime Minister Junichiro Koizumi looked on. Only the highest-ranking awards, such as this rare honor, are bestowed personally by the emperor.

 2001 – Order of Culture.
 1994 – Person of Cultural Merit.

Notes

References
 Yodoi, Toshio. (1997) 彫刻家淀井敏夫の世界展 : 溶け合う形, 自然と人と (Chōkokuka Yodoi Toshio no sekai ten: tokeau katachi, shizen to hito to or Nature and human beings, a fusion of forms: the sculpture of Toshio Yodoi). Tokyo: Setagaya Bijutsukan.  OCLC 46715855

1911 births
2005 deaths
20th-century Japanese sculptors
Artists from Hyōgo Prefecture
People from Hyōgo Prefecture
Recipients of the Order of Culture
Date of death missing